Chaetopleura apiculata is a species of small chiton in the family Chaetopleuridae. It is a marine mollusc.

Distribution
 Gulf of Mexico
 North West Atlantic

Description
Teeth of the radula of this species were studied using atom-probe tomography to analyze the chemical structure; the results were published in 2011. It was shown that the teeth contained fibers surrounded by magnetite, and some of them also contained sodium or magnesium. This was probably the first time that atom-probe tomography was used in the study of a radula and in biominerals.

References

Chaetopleuridae
Chitons described in 1834